Fighter Duel Pro 2 is a 1994 video game published by American studio Jaeger Software for the Amiga.

Gameplay
Fighter Duel Pro 2 is a flight simulator with SVGA-quality graphics and flight models.

Reception
In 1996, Computer Gaming World declared Fighter Duel Pro 2 the 118th-best computer game ever released.

Reviews
Computer Gaming World - Mar, 1994

References

1994 video games
Amiga games
Amiga-only games
Combat flight simulators
Video games developed in the United States